Anna Maria "Marianne" Charlotta Koberwein née Rutenskiöld (Stockholm, 15 December 1791 - Pushkin, Saint Petersburg, August 2, 1856) was a Swedish and later Russian Empire courtier. She is known for her affair with Nicholas I of Russia.

She was the daughter of the Swedish nobleman Gustavus Adolphus Rutenskiöld (1758-1802) and Ulrika Charlotta Stenborg. She served as a lady-in-waiting to the Swedish queen Frederica of Baden, who was married to Gustav IV Adolf of Sweden, and when Gustav IV Adolf was deposed in 1809, she continued her service to Frederica in Karlsruhe. She was subsequently employed by Frederica's sister Elizabeth Alexeievna (Louise of Baden), empress of Russia. At the Russian court, she became acquainted with Nicholas I of Russia, with whom she had a daughter, Joséphine Koberwein: in parallel, she married (Joseph) Vassiliévitch Koberwein (1789-1854), from whom she divorced soon after.

References 
 Jacques Ferrand, Descendants naturels des souverains et grands-ducs de Russie de 1762 à 1910 : répertoire généalogique, 410 pages, Paris, 1995 (pas d'ISBN ni mention d'éditeur)

1791 births
1856 deaths
Swedish ladies-in-waiting
Ladies-in-waiting from the Russian Empire
Swedish emigrants to the Russian Empire
Mistresses of Russian royalty